Dmitri Vladimirovich Shestakov (born 26 February 1983) is a former Russian professional football player.

Club career
He played 3 seasons in the Russian Football National League for FC Chkalovets-1936 Novosibirsk, FC Spartak-MZhK Ryazan and FC Fakel Voronezh.

References

External links
 

1983 births
Footballers from Moscow
Living people
Russian footballers
Association football midfielders
FC Sibir Novosibirsk players
FC Fakel Voronezh players
FC Tyumen players
FC Rubin Kazan players
FC Spartak Kostroma players
FC Olimp-Dolgoprudny players
FC Sportakademklub Moscow players
FC Spartak-MZhK Ryazan players